Mount Bowen is a mountain located on Hinchinbrook Island, off the north east coast of Queensland, Australia. It rises  out of the Coral Sea.

On this mountain in April 1997, hiker Warren MacDonald became trapped beneath a one-ton slab of stone in a freak rock fall. Two days later he was rescued, only to undergo the amputation of both his legs at mid thigh. His book One Step Beyond chronicles his attempt at climbing Mount Bowen. The accident is the subject of the episode Trapped Under a Boulder, part of the Discovery Channel series, I Shouldn't Be Alive.

See also

 List of mountains of Australia

References

Bowen
Landforms of Far North Queensland